Bhiria road is a city in Naushahro Feroze District in Sindh province of Pakistan, spanning 4.52 square kilometers. Bhiria road is a commercial hub in Naushehro feroz district

Agriculture
Bhiria Road and adjacent area is very fertile and canal water for irrigation is available in abundance. Wheat, sugarcane, maize and cotton are the main crops in this part of the Naushahro Feroze District, Province of Sindh. There is huge whole sale market for these agricultural products and traders from around whole southern Sindh visit it where they buy in bulk the products.

Facilities

Railway Station: Bhiria Road has its own railway station which was built (in 1922) on main railway line running from Karachi to Peshawar via Rohri. It is located at a distance of 220 miles (350 km) from Karachi and 68 miles (110 km) from Rohri. This railway station serves the people of adjacent towns (Karundi, Pacca Chang, Raid Haji Darya khan Jalbani, Bhiria City, Kandiaro, Tharushah and Naushahro Feroz and the rural areas adjacent to these towns).

Road transport: Round the clock road transport (rent a car, coaches and SUVs) are available in the parking area of railway station which may take to places as far as Karachi in the south and Peshawar in the north. In addition to this, regular coach service is available for Karachi, Hyderabad, Nawab Shah and Sukkur which leave at their scheduled timings with reasonable fare.

Education A higher secondary School, two secondary schools for boys and girls respectively and a large number of private schools are providing quality education to the children of this area. Due to high quality education facilities, Bhiria Road is favorite town for the officials of various public and private sector organizations who prefer their posting here and after retirement many of them opt to settle here.

Naushahro Feroze District